Ikerasaarsuk is a village in Qeqertalik municipality in western Greenland. Its population was 98 in 2021.

Transport 
Air Greenland serves the village as part of government contract, with winter-only helicopter flights from Ikerasaarsuk Heliport to Iginniarfik Heliport and Kangaatsiaq Heliport. Settlement flights in the Aasiaat Archipelago are unique in that they are operated only during winter and spring.

During summer and autumn, when the waters of Disko Bay are navigable, communication between settlements is by sea only, serviced by Diskoline. The ferry links Ikerasaarsuk with Kangaatsiaq, Attu, Iginniarfik, Niaqornaarsuk, and Aasiaat.

Population 
The population of Ikerasaarsuk has been stable in the last two decades, increasing by half since 1990, and levelling off in the 2000s.

References

Populated places in Greenland
Populated places of Arctic Greenland
Qeqertalik